Pyrrhoernestia is a genus of parasitic flies in the family Tachinidae. There are at least two described species in Pyrrhoernestia.

Species
These two species belong to the genus Pyrrhoernestia:
 Pyrrhoernestia peticola Townsend, 1931
 Pyrrhoernestia petiolata Townsend

References

Further reading

 
 
 
 

Tachinidae
Articles created by Qbugbot